B&M European Value Retail S.A., trading as B&M, is a British multinational variety store chain founded in 1978 and incorporated in Luxembourg. It is listed on the London Stock Exchange, and is a constituent of the FTSE 100 Index.

As of January 2023, B&M has stores in the United Kingdom and France.

History
The business was founded by Malcolm Billington and the first store opened in Cleveleys, England, in 1978 and was acquired by Simon and Bobby Arora from Phildrew Investments in December 2004.

In September 2006, the business saw significant growth, by acquiring the GlynWebb chain of Do It Yourself (DIY) stores and converting them into the B&M Homestore format. The company also acquired a number of former Kwik Save, Woolworths, and Au-Naturale stores.

The business moved into a new office and modern  distribution centre based in Speke, Liverpool in 2010. In May 2011, B&M also purchased a number of Focus DIY stores.

In 2012, B&M  pleaded guilty at Mansfield Magistrates Court to six fire safety offences under the Regulatory Reform (Fire Safety) Order 2005 following a visit from Fire Protection officers of the Nottinghamshire Fire and Rescue Service to their Mansfield store in October 2011. Officers had previously visited in June 2011 and found numerous breaches of the order, including blocked fire exits. However, the failings were found to have been repeated in the revisit and the firm was fined £32,984.17.

In December 2012, Clayton, Dubilier & Rice, one of the world's leading private equity funds, acquired a significant stake in B&M, and Sir Terry Leahy and Vindi Banga joined the Board of Directors.

In March 2014, the business acquired a majority stake in German discount retailer Jawoll and then opened a new 500,000 sq ft distribution centre in Speke, Liverpool. In June 2014, the business was the subject of an initial public offering. However, upon detailed analysis by the Columbia Business school, it was found the IPO of B&M was overhyped due to an already saturated market in the UK.

In November 2014, the business opened its 400th store (in Stockport) and claimed to serve in excess of three million customers every week.

During July 2017, the company completed the acquisition of the smaller frozen food store chain Heron Foods for £152 million. In 2018 the company started a trial of converting Heron Food branches to B&M Express.

In 2018, B&M was fined a record £480,000 by Barkingside Magistrates’ Court for selling knives to three children under the age of 18 in test purchases at stores in Redbridge and Barking. The fine was reduced from £720,000 as the business pleaded guilty.

As of 31 January 2018, B&M European Value Retail S.A. had issued 1,000,561,222 ordinary shares at the opening price of 10 pence.

In October 2018, the company acquired French discount retailer Babou for €91.2 million, and by the end of 2021, the Babou brand was replaced by B&M.

On 4 February 2022, the company opened its 700th store at Border Retail Park in Wrexham.

COVID-19 rates relief controversy
In March 2020, as a result of the COVID-19 pandemic in the United Kingdom, Rishi Sunak, then Chancellor of the Exchequer, gave business rates relief and furlough payments to businesses in the hospitality and retail sectors.
B&M was among several businesses classified as 'essential retailers' and as a result was allowed to remain open when other 'non-essential businesses had to close. In November 2020, B&M and other retailers were subject to a public outcry for having not handed back payments totalling £1.8 billion intended for propping up retailers prevented from trading due to restrictions, despite making record profits. The retailer declared £296 million in profit and as a result issued a £250 million special dividend despite having received £38 million in business rates relief and £3.7 million in furlough payments. Brothers Simon and Bobby Arora, the CEO and trading director respectively, received a combined total of £37 million of the special dividend due to their 15% shareholding which is said to worth at least £750 million. The firm agreed to pay £80 million in business rate relief it had saved, a move mirrored by major supermarkets including Tesco, Sainsbury's and Morrisons.

Domestic operations
As of 2021, the company currently has 686 stores in the UK and a further 275 Heron Foods stores. 

Over the period 2016 to 2018, the company opened another 100 stores as it reached 600 stores in November 2018.

In September 2020, the company announced that it planned to open about 45 stores, offering everything from tinned and frozen meals to wallpaper and bedding plants, which has become a lockdown phenomenon.

Since September 2012, some stores have also been selling National Lottery goods.

International operations

France
B&M operates 104 stores in France.

Financial performance
The financial performance has been as follows:

References

External links
 B&M retail website
 B&M corporate website

1978 establishments in the United Kingdom
Companies based in Liverpool
Discount shops of the United Kingdom
Privately held companies of the United Kingdom
Retail companies established in 1978
Retail companies of the United Kingdom
Variety stores
Companies listed on the London Stock Exchange